Andrei Nikolayevich Kondratyuk (born 20 December 1982) is a Russian professional football coach and a former player. He is the goalkeepers' coach at FC Rostov.

Club career
He played 7 seasons in the Russian Football National League for 4 different clubs.

References

External links
 

1982 births
Footballers from Moscow
Living people
Russian footballers
Association football goalkeepers
FC Volga Nizhny Novgorod players
FC Dynamo Stavropol players
FC Bashinformsvyaz-Dynamo Ufa players
FC Sakhalin Yuzhno-Sakhalinsk players
FC Chayka Peschanokopskoye players
FC Mashuk-KMV Pyatigorsk players
FC Dynamo Makhachkala players